The women's vault competition at the 2012 Summer Olympics was held at the North Greenwich Arena on 5 August.

Qualification results

Reserves

Final results
McKayla Maroney of the United States, the defending world champion and top qualifier to the vault final, was the favourite to win but placed second after falling on her second vault.

Oksana Chusovitina, who placed fifth, set a record by competing in her sixth consecutive Olympic vault final.

 *Black landed on her face during her first vault, and it was deemed by the judges that her feet did not land first (though replays suggested this may not have been the case). She started to attempt a second vault, but ran past the table due to realising that she was more injured than she thought. She had the option to attempt her second vault again, but declined due to injury.

References

Gymnastics at the 2012 Summer Olympics
2012
2012 in women's gymnastics
Women's events at the 2012 Summer Olympics